The Assault Tank T14 was a joint project between the United States and the United Kingdom with the goal being to produce a universal infantry tank.

The T14 project never came to fruition, as a pilot model was not delivered to the UK until 1944 by which time the British Churchill tank had been in service for two years and greatly improved over its initial model. US efforts working on a similarly well-armoured tank but with a higher speed for use other than in infantry support led to the T20 Medium Tank.

Design and development
In 1941, the head of the United States Ordnance Department travelled to Britain to learn of their experience, ideas and requirements for the future. Among the discussion was the possibility of designing a well-armed and armoured combat vehicle, one that was stronger than the British Churchill infantry tank then in production.

The British initially ordered 8,500 in 1942 following which detail design work started. Testing of the pilot model which was completed in 1944 showed the vehicle to be much too heavy for practical use. By this time, the British Army was satisfied with the Churchill and its cruiser tank designs and further production of the T14 was halted.

Only two were built; one tested in the US and the other sent to Britain. The example sent to Britain survives in The Tank Museum, Bovington. The British had developed the Heavy Assault Tank A33 "Excelsior" design to the same specification as the T14 but this did not go into service either.

See also

List of U.S. military vehicles by model number
Tank classification

Tanks of comparable role, performance and era
British Excelsior - two prototypes built; did not enter service
British Churchill - heavy tank, entered service 1941
Soviet KV-1 - heavy tank, entered service in 1939
American M6 - heavy tank, saw trials but never entered service

References
Notes

Bibliography
David Fletcher The Universal Tank: British Armour in the Second World War
http://www.tankmuseum.org/ixbin/indexplus?:mus_administration_name=VEH&_IXFIRST_=520&_IXSPFX_=templates/full/tvod/t&_IXMAXHITS_=1&submit-button=summary The Tank Museum accession record]

External links

World War II vehicles
United States Medium Tanks

World War II heavy tanks
World War II tanks of the United States
Heavy tanks of the United States
Abandoned military projects of the United States
Abandoned military projects of the United Kingdom
Trial and research tanks of the United States
Trial and research tanks of the United Kingdom
United Kingdom–United States military relations